Säters IF FK is a Swedish football club located in Säter, Dalarnas län. The club is affiliated with Dalarnas Fotbollförbund and they play their home matches at the Säters IP in Säter.

Background
Säters IF FK currently plays in Division 3 Södra Norrland, which is the fifth tier of Swedish football.

Säters IF have competed in the Svenska Cupen on 24 occasions and have played 58 matches in the competition. In the 2006 Svenska Cupen they lost 0–4 to IK Sirius in the first round.

Season to season

Footnotes

External links
 

Football clubs in Dalarna County
1907 establishments in Sweden
Association football clubs established in 1907